The History of Bogor includes various rulers leading up to the development of the densely populated Indonesian city of Bogor. The City of Bogor (Indonesian: Kota Bogor) was once the capital of Sunda Kingdom (Indonesian: Kerajaan Sunda) and was known as Pakuan Pajajaranknown. When the Dutch took over, the town was included in an administrative division known as Buitenzorg during the Dutch East Indies era. After independence, the city became part of the Bogor Regency. It has its history reflected in its architecture which includes buildings from the colonial, modern, post-modern, and contemporary periods. Bogor is located south of Jakarta on the island of Java, Indonesia. It is known for its Bogor Palace, Bogor Botanical Garden.

The kujang is a traditional weapon of the Sundanese people and is paid tribute by the Kujang Monument.

Buitenzorg was connected to Jakarta by rail in 1872. The town was the capital of an assistant-residency.  As of 1894, principal buildings included the Bogor Cathedral, a mosque, a regent's mission, barracks, a prison (built 1848), a bathhouse, a Bogor Botanical Garden (laid out in 1817 by Van de Capellen) and the country palace of the governor-general. Bogor is home to Bogor Agricultural University.

Colonial era architecture

Postmodern and contemporary architecture
Contemporary architecture projects have included the Wood Box House (2009) and Sekolah Bogor Raya (Bogor Raya School) (2012) by Indra Tata Adilaras.

References

Bogor